Eli Coleman is an American sexologist. He is the director of the Program in Human Sexuality at the University of Minnesota, and a professor in the Department of Family Medicine and Community Health. In 2007, he was appointed the first endowed Chair in Sexual Health at the University of Minnesota Medical School. He has published research on sexual orientation, sexual dysfunction and compulsivity, gender dysphoria, and sex offenders.

Coleman is also on the advisory board to Ro, a service for chronic health conditions.

Membership in scientific societies
Coleman is the founding and current editor of the International Journal of Sexual Health (formerly the Journal of Psychology and Human Sexuality).  He was also the founding editor of the International Journal of Transgender Health.

He is one of the past-presidents of the Society for the Scientific Study of Sexuality, the World Professional Association for Transgender Health (formerly the Harry Benjamin International Gender Dysphoria Association), the World Association for Sexual Health (WAS), International Academy of Sex Research, and the Society for Sex Therapy and Research.

Views
Regarding sexual addiction, Coleman has said, "I think the term 'addiction' is overused and implies that all behavioral excesses can be explained by some similar mechanism. What we know about alcohol and drug addictions cannot simply be transferred to other behavioral excesses. Sex is a basic appetitive drive that for some people becomes out of balance for a variety of reasons. For some it is a problem of impulse control. For others it is more like an obsession. For others, it is like a compulsion. And for others, it is a part of their personality structure and has nothing to do with impulse control, obsessions, or compulsions."

Publications
Some of his significant papers are:
Coleman, E. “Developmental Stages of the Coming Out Process.” Journal of Homosexuality 7(2/3):31—43, 1981/82.
Coleman, E. “Bisexual Women and Lesbians in Heterosexual Marriage.” Journal of Homosexuality 11:87-113, 1985.
 
Coleman, E. “Bisexuality: Challenging Our Understanding of Human Sexuality and Sexual Orientation.” In Shelp. E.E. (ed.). Sexuality and Medicine, Vol. 1. pp. 225–242. New York: Reidel Publishing, 1987.
Coleman, E. and Bockting, W. O. "“Heterosexual” Prior to Sex Reassignment – “Homosexual” Afterwards: A Case Study of a Female-to-Male Transsexual." Archives of Sexual Behavior 1(2): 69–82, 1988.
 
 
Coleman, E. and Bockting, W. O. "A Comment on the Concept of Transhomosexuality, or the Dissociation of the Meaning." Archives of Sexual Behavior 20(4): 419–21, 1991.
Coleman, E., Bockting, W. O. and Gooren, L. "Homosexual and Bisexual Identity in Sex-Reassigned Female to Male Transsexuals." Archives of Sexual Behavior 22(1): 37–50, 1993.
 
 Satcher D, Hook EW, III, Coleman E. Sexual Health in America: Improving Patient Care and Public Health. JAMA. 2015;314(8):765-766. doi:10.1001/jama.2015.6831.

References

External links
Eli Coleman's page at the University of Minnesota

American sexologists
University of Minnesota faculty
Transgender studies academics
Living people
1948 births